Annunziata Mary Rees-Mogg (born 25 March 1979) is a freelance journalist whose focus is finance, economics, and European politics and has been a British Brexit Party then Conservative politician during 2019 and into early 2020.

She has been a leader writer for The Daily Telegraph, deputy editor of MoneyWeek, and editor of the European Journal, a Eurosceptic magazine owned by Bill Cash's think tank, the European Foundation.

Formerly active in Conservative Party politics, she was added to the Conservative Party's A-List by David Cameron. She was unsuccessful in her attempts as a Conservative parliamentary candidate in the 2005 and 2010 general elections.

On 12 April 2019, she was selected as a candidate for the Brexit Party in the East Midlands constituency in the European Parliament elections, and she won a seat. She resigned the party whip in December 2019 to support the Conservative Party's Brexit strategy. She later rejoined the Conservative Party in January 2020.

Early life and education
Annunziata Mary Rees-Mogg is one of the daughters of William Rees-Mogg, Baron Rees-Mogg, a former editor of The Times, and his wife Gillian Shakespeare Morris; she is the youngest sister of Jacob Rees-Mogg.

She joined the Conservative Party at the age of five. She later said of this "I was too young to be a Young Conservative, so I joined the main party. Aged eight I was out canvassing, proudly wearing my rosette."

She was educated at Godolphin and Latymer School in Hammersmith, West London, an independent day school for girls. There, she took A Levels in History, Chemistry and Economics, which she has called "a very odd mix".

Career 
After leaving school in 1997, she decided against going to a university, and instead tried a series of different jobs, in journalism, investment banking, publishing, public relations, and stockbroking. In 1998, she moved with her family to Mells, Somerset.

In 2003 she set up Trust the People, a campaign for a referendum on the European Constitution aimed at those too young to have voted in the Common Market referendum of 1975. Speaking about the 2003 Iraq War, she subsequently said, "I think it was a terrible mistake". She opposed the Hunting Act 2004, which outlawed hunting of wild mammals with dogs.

In the 2005 general election Rees-Mogg came fourth in the safe Labour seat of Aberavon, South Wales, increasing the Conservative vote from 2,096 to 3,064.

She was selected as prospective parliamentary candidate for Somerton and Frome in 2006. The Observer said of her, "Having enjoyed finance and journalism, she combined the two in a career as a financial journalist. When she turns to discussing Gordon Brown's economic record, she does so with authority." In November 2007, she wrote an article for MoneyWeek magazine entitled "How to profit from the world's water crisis", setting out some of the investment opportunities in the sector. An article in The Sunday Telegraph in October 2009 reported, "Some high-profile women are already installed in winnable seats: Louise Bagshawe [now Mensch], Annunziata Rees-Mogg, Priti Patel, Laura Sandys and Joanne Cash will all make colourful additions to the Tory benches." However, at the 2010 general election, Rees-Mogg failed to take the Somerton and Frome seat from the sitting Liberal Democrat member David Heath.

It was reported that in advance of the 2010 election David Cameron had asked Rees-Mogg to shorten her name for political purposes to Nancy Mogg, which her brother Jacob has since said was "a joke". Rees-Mogg later commented: "I think it's phoney to pretend to be someone you're not." Cameron subsequently dropped her from the Conservative Party's 2011 pre-selections, despite strong support from many female party members.

Having been elected as a MEP for the Brexit Party at the 2019 European Parliamentary elections and serving for seven months, Rees Mogg defected very prominently back to her former party of membership, Conservative. The defection began through leaving the Brexit Party over a month before the UK left the EU and one week prior to a UK General Election which was critical for the Brexit Party, and by at the same time urging voters to vote Conservative. Rees-Mogg sat as an independent in the European Parliament for a month, to become a Conservative MEP in January 2020, just three weeks before the UK left the EU and all MEP positions were abolished.

During 2019 and until her tactically timed defection away from the party, Mogg had been a high-profile Brexit Party backer and advocate. (The Brexit Party has since become the political party Reform UK).

Rees-Mogg served as an Member of the European Parliament (MEP) for the East Midlands region from May 2019 until the United Kingdom's withdrawal from the EU on 31 January 2020.

Personal life
In September 2010, Rees-Mogg became engaged to Matthew Glanville, and on 6 November 2010 they were married in Italy at Lucca. Four months later, on 8 March 2011, she gave birth to a daughter, Isadora, who was christened in St Martin's Church, Welton le Marsh in Lincolnshire. In 2018 she gave birth to a second daughter, Molly. In late 2019, she announced she was expecting a third child.

References

1979 births
Living people
English people of American descent
English people of Irish descent
Annunziata
English newspaper editors
English Roman Catholics
Daughters of life peers
People educated at Godolphin and Latymer School
People from Mendip District
Conservative Party (UK) politicians
Women newspaper editors
Conservative Party (UK) parliamentary candidates
Brexit Party MEPs
People from Bath, Somerset
People from Somerset
MEPs for England 2019–2020
21st-century women MEPs for England
Independent politicians in England
Conservative Party (UK) MEPs